Brändängesbäcken is a river in Sweden, which flows through Piteå municipality, Norrbotten and Skellefteå municipality, Västerbotten. Its source is east of Tväråliden in Piteå municipality.

Rivers of Norrbotten County
Rivers of Västerbotten County